Col·legi Casp–Sagrat Cor de Jesús (in English "Casp College-Sacred Heart of Jesus") is a Jesuit school in Barcelona, Catalonia, Spain, founded in 1881. Its Catalan name refers to both the school's location on Casp Street (Carrer de Casp) and the attached church, the Església del Sagrat Cor de Jesús. Both the school and church are run by the "Casp Jesuits" (Jesuïtes de Casp).

History
Col·legi Casp is the successor to two Jesuit schools in the city: Col·legi de Betlem, founded 1546, and Col·legi de Cordelles, given to the Jesuits in 1659. Both were situated on the Rambla dels Estudis and were open until the expulsion of the Jesuit order in 1767.

Col·legi Casp opened October 1, 1881, initially with 108 students. The political environment in Spain at the time had an effect on the school's growth. In 1932, it was converted into a municipal school due to the dissolution of the Society of Jesus, which returned in 1939. Col·legi Casp's enrollment increased soon after, and the school expanded into adjacent buildings.

In 1971, the school became a co-ed institution with its first female students. The next year it began offering Catalan courses and, in 1978, began teaching in Catalan. By the 1983–84 school year, the entire school had become co-ed. Currently, Col·legi Casp has more than 1,700 students of both sexes between the primary, compulsory secondary, and non-compulsory secondary (batxillerat) sections of the school. The Casp Jesuits have graduated around 25,000 students, many of whom have become well known in Catalan society. In 2007, Col·legi Casp received the Medal of Honor of Barcelona (Medalla d'Honor de Barcelona).

Relations with other schools
Col·legi Casp's batxillerat section is very active with student exchange programs. Among its partner schools are:

In Belgium:
Collège Saint-Michel in Brussels
In France:
Ecole de Provence in Marseille
In Canada:
Collège Jean-de-Brébeuf in Montreal, Quebec
In the United States:
Brebeuf Jesuit Preparatory School in Indianapolis, Indiana
Loyola Academy near Chicago, Illinois
Magnificat High School near Cleveland, Ohio
St. Ignatius High School in Cleveland, Ohio
St. John's Jesuit High School in Toledo, Ohio
St. Ursula Academy in Cincinnati, Ohio
St. Xavier High School in Cincinnati, Ohio
Walsh Jesuit High School near Akron, Ohio
St. Ursula Academy (Toledo, Ohio) in Toledo, Ohio
In addition, the school's primary section participates in the Comenius programme.

Notable alumni
Iñaki Urdangarin, Duke of Palma de Mallorca – bronze medalist in handball at the 1996 and 2000 Summer Olympics
Francesc Vendrell – Spanish diplomat

See also
 List of Jesuit sites

References

External links

 Col·legi Casp
 Església del Sagrat Cor
Col·legi Casp at the Ignatian Wiki

Secondary schools in Spain
Jesuit secondary schools in Spain
Education in Barcelona
Educational institutions established in 1881
1881 establishments in Spain